Harry S. Truman (May 8, 1884December 26, 1972) was the 33rd president of the United States, serving from 1945 to 1953. A leader of the Democratic Party, he previously served as the 34th vice president from January to April 1945 under Franklin Roosevelt and as a United States senator from Missouri from 1935 to January 1945. Assuming the presidency after Roosevelt's death, Truman implemented the Marshall Plan to rebuild the economy of Western Europe and established both the Truman Doctrine and NATO to contain the expansion of Soviet communism. He proposed numerous liberal domestic reforms, but few were enacted by the conservative coalition that dominated the Congress.

Truman grew up in Independence, Missouri, and during World War I fought in France as a captain in the Field Artillery. Returning home, he opened a haberdashery in Kansas City, Missouri, and was elected as a judge of Jackson County in 1922. Truman was elected to the United States Senate from Missouri in 1934. In 1940–1944 he gained national prominence as chairman of the Truman Committee, which was aimed at reducing waste and inefficiency in wartime contracts. 

Truman was elected vice-president in 1944 and assumed the presidency following the death of Roosevelt. Not until he became president was Truman was informed about the ongoing Manhattan Project and the atomic bomb. Truman authorized the first and only use of nuclear weapons in war against Hiroshima and Nagasaki in Japan. Truman's administration engaged in an internationalist foreign policy by working closely with British Prime Minister Clement Attlee. Truman staunchly denounced isolationism. He energized the New Deal coalition during the 1948 presidential election and won a surprise victory against Republican Thomas E. Dewey that secured his own presidential term.

Truman presided over the onset of the Cold War in 1947. He oversaw the Berlin Airlift and Marshall Plan in 1948. With the involvement of the US in the Korean War of 1950–1953, South Korea repelled the invasion by North Korea. Domestically, the postwar economic challenges such as strikes and inflation created a mixed reaction over the effectiveness of his administration. In 1948, he proposed Congress pass comprehensive civil rights legislation. Congress refused, so in 1948 Truman issued Executive Order 9980 and Executive Order 9981 which desegregated the armed forces and federal agencies.

Corruption in the Truman administration became a central campaign issue in the 1952 presidential election. He was eligible for reelection in 1952, but with weak polls he decided not to run. Republican Dwight D. Eisenhower attacked Truman's record and won easily. Truman went into a retirement marked by the founding of his presidential library and the publication of his memoirs. It was long thought that his retirement years were financially difficult for Truman, resulting in Congress establishing a pension for former presidents, but evidence eventually emerged that he amassed considerable wealth, some of it while still president. When he left office, Truman's administration was heavily criticized, though critical reassessment of his presidency has improved his reputation among historians and the general population.

Early life, family, and education

Truman was born in Lamar, Missouri, on May 8, 1884, the oldest child of John Anderson Truman and Martha Ellen Young Truman. He was named for his maternal uncle, Harrison "Harry" Young. His middle initial, "S", is not an abbreviation of one particular name. Rather, it honors both his grandfathers, Anderson Shipp Truman and Solomon Young, a semi-common practice in the American South. A brother, John Vivian, was born soon after Harry, followed by sister Mary Jane. Truman's ancestry is primarily English with some Scots-Irish, German, and French.

John Truman was a farmer and livestock dealer. The family lived in Lamar until Harry was ten months old, when they moved to a farm near Harrisonville, Missouri. They next moved to Belton and in 1887 to his grandparents'  farm in Grandview. When Truman was six, his parents moved to Independence, Missouri, so he could attend the Presbyterian Church Sunday School. He did not attend a conventional school until he was eight years old. While living in Independence, he served as a Shabbos goy for Jewish neighbors, doing tasks for them on Shabbat that their religion prevented them from doing on that day.

Truman was interested in music, reading, and history, all encouraged by his mother, with whom he was very close. As president, he solicited political as well as personal advice from her. Truman learned to play the piano at age seven and took lessons from Mrs. E.C. White, a well-respected teacher in Kansas City. He got up at five o’clock every morning to practice the piano, which he studied more than twice a week until he was fifteen, becoming quite a skilled player. Truman worked as a page at the 1900 Democratic National Convention in Kansas City; his father had many friends active in the Democratic Party who helped young Harry to gain his first political position.

After graduating from Independence High School in 1901, Truman took classes at Spalding's Commercial College, a Kansas City business school. He studied bookkeeping, shorthand, and typing but stopped after a year.

Working career 

Truman was employed briefly in the mailroom of The Kansas City Star before making use of his business college experience to obtain a job as a timekeeper for construction crews on the Atchison, Topeka & Santa Fe Railway, which required him to sleep in workmen's camps along the rail lines. Truman and his brother Vivian later worked as clerks at the National Bank of Commerce in Kansas City.

In 1906, Truman returned to the Grandview farm, where he lived until entering the army in 1917. During this period, he courted Bess Wallace. He proposed in 1911, but she turned him down. Truman later said he intended to propose again, but he wanted to have a better income than that earned by a farmer. To that end, during his years on the farm and immediately after World War I, he became active in several business ventures. These included a lead and zinc mine near Commerce, Oklahoma, a company that bought land and leased the oil drilling rights to prospectors, and speculation in Kansas City real estate. Truman occasionally derived some income from these enterprises, but none proved successful in the long term.

Truman is the only president since William McKinley (elected in 1896) who did not earn a college degree. In addition to having briefly attended business college, from 1923 to 1925 he took night courses toward an LL.B. at the Kansas City Law School (now the University of Missouri–Kansas City School of Law) but dropped out after losing reelection as county judge. He was informed by attorneys in the Kansas City area that his education and experience were probably sufficient to receive a license to practice law, but did not pursue it because he won election as presiding judge.

While serving as president in 1947, Truman applied for a law license. A friend who was an attorney began working out the arrangements, and informed Truman that his application had to be notarized. By the time Truman received this information he had changed his mind, so he never followed up. After the discovery of Truman's application in 1996 the Missouri Supreme Court issued him a posthumous honorary law license.

Military service

National Guard
Due to the lack of funds for college, Truman considered attending the United States Military Academy at West Point, New York, which had no tuition, but he was refused an appointment because of poor eyesight. He enlisted in the Missouri National Guard in 1905 and served until 1911 in the Kansas City-based Battery B, 2nd Missouri Field Artillery Regiment, in which he attained the rank of corporal. At his induction, his eyesight without glasses was unacceptable 20/50 in the right eye and 20/400 in the left (past the standard for legal blindness). The second time he took the test, he passed by secretly memorizing the eye chart. He was described as 5 feet 10 inches tall, gray eyed, dark haired and of light complexion.

World War I
When the United States entered World War I on April 6, 1917, Truman rejoined Battery B, successfully recruiting new soldiers for the expanding unit, for which he was elected as their first lieutenant. Before deployment to France, Truman was sent for training to Camp Doniphan, Fort Sill, near Lawton, Oklahoma, when his regiment was federalized as the 129th Field Artillery. The regimental commander during its training was Robert M. Danford, who later served as the Army's Chief of Field Artillery. Truman recalled that he learned more practical, useful information from Danford in six weeks than from six months of formal Army instruction, and when Truman served as an artillery instructor, he consciously patterned his approach on Danford's.

Truman also ran the camp canteen with Edward Jacobson, a clothing store clerk he knew from Kansas City. Unlike most canteens funded by unit members, which usually lost money, the canteen operated by Truman and Jacobson turned a profit, returning each soldier's initial $2 investment and $10,000 in dividends in six months. At Fort Sill, Truman met Lieutenant James M. Pendergast, nephew of Tom Pendergast, a Kansas City political boss, a connection that had a profound influence on Truman's later life.

In mid-1918, about one million soldiers of the American Expeditionary Forces (AEF) were in France. Truman was promoted to captain effective April 23, and in July became commander of the newly arrived Battery D, 129th Field Artillery, 35th Division. Battery D was known for its discipline problems, and Truman was initially unpopular because of his efforts to restore order. Despite attempts by the men to intimidate him into quitting, Truman succeeded by making his corporals and sergeants accountable for discipline. He promised to back them up if they performed capably, and reduce them to private if they did not. In an event memorialized in battery lore as "The Battle of Who Run", his soldiers began to flee during a sudden night attack by the Germans in the Vosges Mountains; Truman succeeded at ordering his men to stay and fight, using profanity from his railroad days. The men were so surprised to hear Truman use such language that they immediately obeyed.

Truman's unit joined in a massive prearranged assault barrage on September 26, 1918, at the opening of the Meuse–Argonne offensive. They advanced with difficulty over pitted terrain to follow the infantry, and set up an observation post west of Cheppy. On September 27, Truman saw through his binoculars an enemy artillery battery deploying across a river in a position which would allow them to fire upon the neighboring 28th Division. Truman's orders limited him to targets facing the 35th Division, but he ignored this and patiently waited until the Germans had walked their horses well away from their guns, ensuring they could not relocate out of range of Truman's battery. He then ordered his men to open fire, and their attack destroyed the enemy battery. His actions were credited with saving the lives of 28th Division soldiers who otherwise would have come under fire from the Germans. Truman was given a dressing down by his regimental commander, Colonel Karl D. Klemm, who threatened to convene a court-martial, but Klemm never followed through, and Truman was not punished.

In other action during the Meuse–Argonne offensive, Truman's battery provided support for George S. Patton's tank brigade, and fired some of the last shots of the war on November 11, 1918. Battery D did not lose any men while under Truman's command in France. To show their appreciation of his leadership, his men presented him with a large loving cup upon their return to the United States after the war.

The war was a transformative experience in which Truman manifested his leadership qualities. He had entered the service in 1917 as a family farmer who had worked in clerical jobs that did not require the ability to motivate and direct others, but during the war, he gained leadership experience and a record of success that greatly enhanced and supported his post-war political career in Missouri.

Truman was brought up in the Presbyterian and Baptist churches, but avoided revivals and sometimes ridiculed revivalist preachers. He rarely spoke about religion, which to him, primarily meant ethical behavior along traditional Protestant lines. Truman once wrote in a letter to his future wife, Bess: "You know that I know nothing about Lent and such things..." Most of the soldiers he commanded in the war were Catholics, and one of his close friends was the 129th Field Artillery's chaplain, Monsignor L. Curtis Tiernan. The two remained friends until Tiernan's death in 1960. Developing leadership and interpersonal skills that later made him a successful politician helped Truman get along with his Catholic soldiers, as he did with soldiers of other Christian denominations and the unit's Jewish members.

Officers' Reserve Corps 

Truman was honorably discharged from the Army as a captain on May 6, 1919. In 1920, he was appointed a major in the Officers Reserve Corps. He became a lieutenant colonel in 1925 and a colonel in 1932. In the 1920s and 1930s he commanded 1st Battalion, 379th Field Artillery, 102d Infantry Division. After promotion to colonel, Truman advanced to command of the same regiment.

After his election to the U.S. Senate, Truman was transferred to the General Assignments Group, a holding unit for less active officers, although he had not been consulted in advance. Truman protested his reassignment, which led to his resumption of regimental command. He remained an active reservist until the early 1940s. Truman volunteered for active military service during World War II, but was not accepted, partly because of age, and partly because President Franklin D. Roosevelt desired senators and congressmen who belonged to the military reserves to support the war effort by remaining in Congress, or by ending their active duty service and resuming their congressional seats. He was an inactive reservist from the early 1940s until retiring as a colonel in the then redesignated U.S. Army Reserve on January 20, 1953.

Military awards and decorations 
Truman was awarded a World War I Victory Medal with two battle clasps (for St. Mihiel and Meuse-Argonne) and a Defensive Sector Clasp. He was also the recipient of two Armed Forces Reserve Medals.

Politics

Jackson County judge 

After his wartime service, Truman returned to Independence, where he married Bess Wallace on June 28, 1919. The couple had one child, Mary Margaret Truman.

Shortly before the wedding, Truman and Jacobson opened a haberdashery together at 104 West 12th Street in downtown Kansas City. After brief initial success, the store went bankrupt during the recession of 1921. Truman did not pay off the last of the debts from that venture until 1935, when he did so with the aid of banker William T. Kemper, who worked behind the scenes to enable Truman's brother Vivian to buy Truman's $5,600 promissory note during the asset sale of a bank that had failed in the Great Depression. The note had risen and fallen in value as it was bought and sold, interest accumulated and Truman made payments, so by the time the last bank to hold it failed, it was worth nearly $9,000. Thanks to Kemper's efforts, Vivian Truman was able to buy it for $1,000. Jacobson and Truman remained close friends even after their store failed, and Jacobson's advice to Truman on Zionism later played a role in the U.S. Government's decision to recognize Israel.

With the help of the Kansas City Democratic machine led by Tom Pendergast, Truman was elected in 1922 as County Court judge of Jackson County's eastern district—Jackson County's three-judge court included judges from the western district (Kansas City), the eastern district (the county outside Kansas City), and a presiding judge elected countywide. This was an administrative rather than a judicial court, similar to county commissions in many other jurisdictions. Truman lost his 1924 reelection campaign in a Republican wave led by President Calvin Coolidge's landslide election to a full term. Two years selling automobile club memberships convinced him that a public service career was safer for a family man approaching middle age, and he planned a run for presiding judge in 1926.

Truman won the job in 1926 with the support of the Pendergast machine, and he was re-elected in 1930. As presiding judge, Truman helped coordinate the Ten Year Plan, which transformed Jackson County and the Kansas City skyline with new public works projects, including an extensive series of roads and construction of a new Wight and Wight-designed County Court building. Also in 1926, he became president of the National Old Trails Road Association, and during his term he oversaw dedication of 12 Madonna of the Trail monuments to honor pioneer women.

In 1933, Truman was named Missouri's director for the Federal Re-Employment program (part of the Civil Works Administration) at the request of Postmaster General James Farley. This was payback to Pendergast for delivering the Kansas City vote to Franklin D. Roosevelt in the 1932 presidential election. The appointment confirmed Pendergast's control over federal patronage jobs in Missouri and marked the zenith of his power. It also created a relationship between Truman and Roosevelt's aide Harry Hopkins and assured Truman's avid support for the New Deal.

U.S. Senator from Missouri 

After serving as a county judge, Truman wanted to run for governor or Congress, but Pendergast rejected these ideas. Truman then thought he might serve out his career in some well-paying county sinecure; circumstances changed when Pendergast reluctantly backed him as the machine's choice in the 1934 Democratic primary election for the U.S. Senate from Missouri, after Pendergast's first four choices had declined to run. In the primary, Truman defeated Congressmen John J. Cochran and Jacob L. Milligan with the solid support of Jackson County, which was crucial to his candidacy. Also critical were the contacts he had made statewide in his capacity as a county official, member of the Freemasons, military reservist, and member of the American Legion. In the general election, Truman defeated incumbent Republican Roscoe C. Patterson by nearly 20 percentage points in a continuing wave of pro-New Deal Democrats elected during  the Great Depression.

Truman assumed office with a reputation as "the Senator from Pendergast". He referred patronage decisions to Pendergast but maintained that he voted with his own conscience. He later defended the patronage decisions by saying that "by offering a little to the machine, [he] saved a lot". In his first term, Truman spoke out against corporate greed and the dangers of Wall Street speculators and other moneyed special interests attaining too much influence in national affairs. Though he served on the high-profile Appropriations and Interstate Commerce Committees, he was largely ignored by President Roosevelt and had trouble getting calls returned from the White House.

During the U.S. Senate election in 1940, U.S. Attorney Maurice Milligan (former opponent Jacob Milligan's brother) and former governor Lloyd Stark both challenged Truman in the Democratic primary. Truman was politically weakened by Pendergast's imprisonment for income tax evasion the previous year; the senator had remained loyal, having claimed that Republican judges (not the Roosevelt administration) were responsible for the boss's downfall. St. Louis party leader Robert E. Hannegan's support of Truman proved crucial; he later brokered the deal that put Truman on the national ticket. In the end, Stark and Milligan split the anti-Pendergast vote in the Senate Democratic primary and Truman won by a total of 8,000 votes. In the November election, Truman defeated Republican Manvel H. Davis by 51–49 percent. As senator, Truman opposed both Nazi Germany and Communist Russia. Two days after Hitler invaded the Soviet Union in June 1941, he said:

This quote without its last part later became a staple in Soviet and later Russian propaganda as "evidence" of an American conspiracy to destroy the country.

Truman Committee

In late 1940, Truman traveled to various military bases. The waste and profiteering he saw led him to use his chairmanship of the Committee on Military Affairs Subcommittee on War Mobilization to start investigations into abuses while the nation prepared for war. A new special committee was set up under Truman to conduct a formal investigation; the White House supported this plan rather than weather a more hostile probe by the House of Representatives. The main mission of the committee was to expose and fight waste and corruption in the gigantic government wartime contracts.

Truman's initiative convinced Senate leaders of the necessity for the committee, which reflected his demands for honest and efficient administration and his distrust of big business and Wall Street. Truman managed the committee "with extraordinary skill" and usually achieved consensus, generating heavy media publicity that gave him a national reputation. Activities of the Truman Committee ranged from criticizing the "dollar-a-year men" hired by the government, many of whom proved ineffective, to investigating a shoddily built New Jersey housing project for war workers. In March 1944, Truman attempted to probe the expensive Manhattan Project but was persuaded by Secretary of War Henry L. Stimson to discontinue with the investigation.

The committee reportedly saved as much as $15 billion (equivalent to $ billion in ), and its activities put Truman on the cover of Time magazine. According to the Senate's historical minutes, in leading the committee, "Truman erased his earlier public image as an errand-runner for Kansas City politicos", and "no senator ever gained greater political benefits from chairing a special investigating committee than did Missouri's Harry S. Truman."

Vice presidency (1945) 

Roosevelt's advisors knew that Roosevelt might not live out a fourth term and that his vice president would very likely become the next president. Henry Wallace had served as Roosevelt's vice president for four years and was popular on the left, but he was viewed as too far to the left and too friendly to labor for some of Roosevelt's advisers. The President and several of his confidantes wanted to replace Wallace with someone more acceptable to Democratic Party leaders. Outgoing Democratic National Committee chairman Frank C. Walker, incoming chairman Hannegan, party treasurer Edwin W. Pauley, Bronx party boss Ed Flynn, Chicago Mayor Edward Joseph Kelly, and lobbyist George E. Allen all wanted to keep Wallace off the ticket. Roosevelt told party leaders that he would accept either Truman or Supreme Court Justice William O. Douglas.

State and city party leaders strongly preferred Truman, and Roosevelt agreed. Truman had repeatedly said that he was not in the race and that he did not want the vice presidency, and he remained reluctant. One reason was that his wife and sister Mary Jane were both on his Senate staff payroll, and he feared negative publicity. Truman did not campaign for the vice-presidential spot, though he welcomed the attention as evidence that he had become more than the "Senator from Pendergast". Truman's nomination was dubbed the "Second Missouri Compromise" and was well received. The Roosevelt–Truman ticket achieved a 432–99 electoral-vote victory in the election, defeating the Republican ticket of Governor Thomas E. Dewey of New York and running mate Governor John Bricker of Ohio. Truman was sworn in as vice president on January 20, 1945. After the inauguration, Truman called his mother, who instructed him, "Now you behave yourself."

Truman's brief vice-presidency was relatively uneventful. Truman mostly presided over the Senate and attended parties and receptions. He kept the same offices from his Senate years, mostly only using the Vice President's official office in the Capital to greet visitors. Truman was the first vice president to have a Secret Service agent assigned to him. Truman envisioned the office as a liaison between the Senate and the president. On April 10, 1945, Truman cast his only tie-breaking vote as president of the Senate, against a Robert A. Taft amendment that would have blocked the postwar delivery of Lend-Lease Act items contracted for during the war. Roosevelt rarely contacted him, even to inform him of major decisions; the president and vice president met alone together only twice during their time in office.

In one of his first acts as vice president, Truman created some controversy when he attended the disgraced Pendergast's funeral. He brushed aside the criticism, saying simply, "He was always my friend and I have always been his." He had rarely discussed world affairs or domestic politics with Roosevelt; he was uninformed about major initiatives relating to the war and the top-secret Manhattan Project, which was about to test the world's first atomic bomb. In an event that generated negative publicity for Truman, he was photographed with actress Lauren Bacall sitting atop the piano at the National Press Club as he played for soldiers.

Truman had been vice president for 82 days when President Roosevelt died on April 12, 1945. Truman, presiding over the Senate, as usual, had just adjourned the session for the day and was preparing to have a drink in House Speaker Sam Rayburn's office when he received an urgent message to go immediately to the White House, where Eleanor Roosevelt told him that her husband had died after a massive cerebral hemorrhage. Truman asked her if there was anything he could do for her; she replied, "Is there anything we can do for you? For you are the one in trouble now!" He was sworn in as president at 7:09 pm in the West Wing of the White House, by Chief Justice Harlan F. Stone.

Presidency (1945–1953) 

At the White House Truman replaced Roosevelt holdovers with old confidants. The White House was badly understaffed with no more than a dozen aides; they could barely keep up with the heavy work flow of a greatly expanded executive department. Truman acted as his own chief of staff on a daily basis, as well as his own liaison with Congress—a body he already knew very well. He was not well prepared to deal with the press, and never achieved the jovial familiarity of FDR. Filled with latent anger about all the setbacks in his career, he bitterly mistrusted the journalists. He saw them as enemies lying in wait for his next careless miscue. Truman was a very hard worker, often to the point of exhaustion, which left him testy, easily annoyed, and on the verge of appearing unpresidential or petty. In terms of major issues, he discussed them in depth with top advisors. He mastered the details of the federal budget as well as anyone. Truman was a poor speaker reading a text. However, his visible anger made him an effective stump speaker, denouncing his enemies as his supporters hollered back at him "Give Em Hell, Harry!"

Truman surrounded himself with his old friends, and appointed several to high positions that seemed well beyond their competence, including his two secretaries of the treasury, Fred Vinson and John Snyder. His closest friend in the White House was his military aide Harry H. Vaughan, who knew little of military or foreign affairs and was criticized for trading access to the White House for expensive gifts. Truman loved to spend as much time as possible playing poker, telling stories and sipping bourbon. Alonzo Hamby notes that:

First term (1945–1949)

Assuming office 

On his first full day, Truman told reporters: "Boys, if you ever pray, pray for me now. I don't know if you fellas ever had a load of hay fall on you, but when they told me what happened yesterday, I felt like the moon, the stars, and all the planets had fallen on me."

Truman asked all the members of Roosevelt's cabinet to remain in place, but he soon replaced almost all of them, especially with old friends from his Senate days.

Dropping atomic bombs on Japan 
Truman benefited from a honeymoon period from the success in defeating Nazi Germany in Europe and the nation celebrated  on May 8, 1945, his 61st birthday.

Although Truman was told briefly on the afternoon of April 12 that he had a new, highly destructive weapon, it was not until April 25 that Secretary of War Henry Stimson told him the details. 

Truman journeyed to Berlin for the Potsdam Conference with Joseph Stalin and the British leader Winston Churchill. He was there when he learned the Trinity test—the first atomic bomb—on July 16 had been successful. He hinted to Stalin that he was about to use a new kind of weapon against the Japanese. Though this was the first time the Soviets had been officially given information about the atomic bomb, Stalin was already aware of the bomb project—having learned about it through atomic espionage long before Truman did.

In August, the Japanese government refused surrender demands as specifically outlined in the Potsdam Declaration. With the invasion of Japan imminent, Truman approved the schedule for dropping the two available bombs. Truman always said attacking Japan with atomic bombs saved many lives on both sides; military estimates for the invasion of Japan were that it could take a year and result in 250,000 to 500,000 Allied casualties. Hiroshima was bombed on August 6, and Nagasaki three days later, leaving 105,000 dead. The Soviet Union declared war on Japan on August 9 and invaded Manchuria. Japan agreed to surrender the following day.

Supporters of Truman's decision argue that, given the tenacious Japanese defense of the outlying islands, the bombings saved hundreds of thousands of lives of Allied prisoners, Japanese civilians, and combatants on both sides that would have been lost in an invasion of Japan. Critics have argued that the use of nuclear weapons was unnecessary, given that conventional attacks or a demonstrative bombing of an uninhabited area might have forced Japan's surrender and therefore assert that the attack constituted a crime of war. In 1948 Truman defended his decision to use atomic bombs:

Truman continued to strongly defend himself in his memoirs in 1955–1956, stating many lives could have been lost had the United States invaded mainland Japan without the atomic bombs. In 1963, he stood by his decision, telling a journalist "it was done to save 125,000 youngsters on the U.S. side and 125,000 on the Japanese side from getting killed and that is what it did. It probably also saved a half million youngsters on both sides from being maimed for life."

Labor unions, strikes and economic issues 

The end of World War II was followed by an uneasy transition from war to a peacetime economy. The costs of the war effort had been enormous, and Truman was intent on diminishing military services as quickly as possible to curtail the government's military expenditures. The effect of demobilization on the economy was unknown, proposals were met with skepticism and resistance, and fears existed that the nation would slide back into depression. In Roosevelt's final years, Congress began to reassert legislative power and Truman faced a congressional body where Republicans and conservative southern Democrats formed a powerful "conservative coalition" voting bloc. The New Deal had greatly strengthened labor unions and they formed a major base of support for Truman's Democratic Party. The Republicans, working with big business, made it their highest priority to weaken those unions. The unions had been promoted by the government during the war and tried to make their gains permanent through large-scale strikes in major industries. Meanwhile, price controls were slowly ending and inflation was soaring. Truman's response to the widespread dissatisfaction was generally seen as ineffective.

When a national rail strike threatened in May 1946, Truman seized the railroads in an attempt to contain the issue, but two key railway unions struck anyway. The entire national railroad system was shut down, immobilizing 24,000 freight trains and 175,000 passenger trains a day. For two days, public anger mounted. His staff prepared a speech that Truman read to Congress calling for a new law, whereby railroad strikers would be drafted into the army. As he concluded his address, he was handed a note that the strike had been settled on presidential terms; nevertheless, a few hours later, the House voted to draft the strikers. The bill died in the Senate.

Approval rating falls; Republicans win Congress in 1946
The president's approval rating dropped from 82 percent in the polls in January 1946 to 52 percent by June. This dissatisfaction led to large Democratic losses in the 1946 midterm elections, and Republicans took control of Congress for the first time since 1930. When Truman dropped to 32 percent in the polls, Democratic Arkansas Senator William Fulbright suggested that Truman resign; the president said he did not care what Senator "Halfbright" said.

Truman cooperated closely with the Republican leaders on foreign policy but fought them bitterly on domestic issues. The power of the labor unions was significantly curtailed by the Taft–Hartley Act which was enacted over Truman's veto. Truman twice vetoed bills to lower income tax rates in 1947. Although the initial vetoes were sustained, Congress overrode his veto of a tax cut bill in 1948. In one notable instance of bipartisanship, Congress passed the Presidential Succession Act of 1947, which replaced the secretary of state with the Speaker of the House and the president pro tempore of the Senate as successor to the president after the vice president.

Proposes "Fair Deal" liberalism 
As he readied for the 1948 election, Truman made clear his identity as a Democrat in the New Deal tradition, advocating for national health insurance, and repeal of the Taft–Hartley Act. He broke with the New Deal by initiating an aggressive civil rights program which he termed a moral priority. His economic and social vision constituted a broad legislative agenda that came to be called the "Fair Deal." Truman's proposals were not well received by Congress, even with renewed Democratic majorities in Congress after 1948. The Solid South rejected civil rights as those states still enforced segregation. Only one of the major Fair Deal bills, the Housing Act of 1949, was ever enacted. Many of the New Deal programs that persisted during Truman's presidency have since received minor improvements and extensions.

Marshall Plan, Cold War, and China 

As a Wilsonian internationalist, Truman supported Roosevelt's policy in favor of the creation of the United Nations and included Eleanor Roosevelt on the delegation to the first UN General Assembly. With the Soviet Union expanding its sphere of influence through Eastern Europe, Truman and his foreign policy advisors took a hard line against the USSR. In this, he matched U.S. public opinion which quickly came to believe the Soviets were intent upon world domination.

Although he had little personal expertise on foreign matters, Truman listened closely to his top advisors, especially George Marshall and Dean Acheson. The Republicans controlled Congress in 1947–1948, so he worked with their leaders, especially Senator Arthur H. Vandenburg, chairman of the powerful Foreign Relations Committee. He won bipartisan support for both the Truman Doctrine, which formalized a policy of Soviet containment, and the Marshall Plan, which aimed to help rebuild postwar Europe.

To get Congress to spend the vast sums necessary to restart the moribund European economy, Truman used an ideological argument, arguing that communism flourishes in economically deprived areas. As part of the U.S. Cold War strategy, Truman signed the National Security Act of 1947 and reorganized military forces by merging the Department of War and the Department of the Navy into the National Military Establishment (later the Department of Defense) and creating the U.S. Air Force. The act also created the Central Intelligence Agency (CIA) and the National Security Council. In 1952, Truman secretly consolidated and empowered the cryptologic elements of the United States by creating the National Security Agency (NSA).

Truman did not know what to do about China, where the Nationalists and Communists were fighting a large-scale civil war. The Nationalists had been major wartime allies and had large-scale popular support in the United States, along with a powerful lobby. General George Marshall spent most of 1946 in China trying to negotiate a compromise, but failed. He convinced Truman the Nationalists would never win on their own and a very large-scale U.S. intervention to stop the Communists would significantly weaken U.S. opposition to the Soviets in Europe. By 1949, the Communists under Mao Zedong had won the civil war, the United States had a new enemy in Asia, and Truman came under fire from conservatives for "losing" China.

Berlin airlift 

On June 24, 1948, the Soviet Union blocked access to the three Western-held sectors of Berlin. The Allies had not negotiated a deal to guarantee supply of the sectors deep within the Soviet-occupied zone. The commander of the U.S. occupation zone in Germany, General Lucius D. Clay, proposed sending a large armored column across the Soviet zone to West Berlin with instructions to defend itself if it were stopped or attacked. Truman believed this would entail an unacceptable risk of war. He approved Ernest Bevin's plan to supply the blockaded city by air.

On June 25, the Allies initiated the Berlin Airlift, a campaign to deliver food, coal and other supplies using military aircraft on a massive scale. Nothing like it had ever been attempted before, and no single nation had the capability, either logistically or materially, to accomplish it. The airlift worked; ground access was again granted on May 11, 1949. Nevertheless, the airlift continued for several months after that. The Berlin Airlift was one of Truman's great foreign policy successes; it significantly aided his election campaign in 1948.

Recognition of Israel 

Truman had long taken an interest in the history of the Middle East and was sympathetic to Jews who sought to re-establish their ancient homeland in Mandatory Palestine. As a senator, he announced support for Zionism; in 1943 he called for a homeland for those Jews who survived the Nazi regime. However, State Department officials were reluctant to offend the Arabs, who were opposed to the establishment of a Jewish state in the large region long populated and dominated culturally by Arabs. Secretary of Defense James Forrestal warned Truman of the importance of Saudi Arabian oil in another war; Truman replied he would decide his policy on the basis of justice, not oil. U.S. diplomats with experience in the region were opposed, but Truman told them he had few Arabs among his constituents.

Palestine was secondary to the goal of protecting the "Northern Tier" of Greece, Turkey, and Iran from communism, as promised by the Truman Doctrine. Weary of both the convoluted politics of the Middle East and pressure by Jewish leaders, Truman was undecided on his policy and skeptical about how the Jewish "underdogs" would handle power. He later cited as decisive in his recognition of the Jewish state the advice of his former business partner, Eddie Jacobson, a non-religious Jew whom Truman absolutely trusted.

Truman decided to recognize Israel over the objections of Secretary of State George Marshall, who feared it would hurt relations with the populous Arab states. Marshall believed the paramount threat to the United States was the Soviet Union and feared Arab oil would be lost to the United States in the event of war; he warned Truman the United States was "playing with fire with nothing to put it out". Truman recognized the State of Israel on May 14, 1948, eleven minutes after it declared itself a nation. Of his decision to recognize the Israeli state, Truman said in an interview years later: "Hitler had been murdering Jews right and left. I saw it, and I dream about it even to this day. The Jews needed some place where they could go. It is my attitude that the American government couldn't stand idly by while the victims [of] Hitler's madness are not allowed to build new lives."

Calls for Civil Rights
Under his predecessor, Franklin D. Roosevelt, the Fair Employment Practices Committee was created to address racial discrimination in employment, and in 1946, Truman created the President's Committee on Civil Rights. On June 29, 1947, Truman became the first president to address the National Association for the Advancement of Colored People (NAACP). The speech took place at the Lincoln Memorial during the NAACP convention and was carried nationally on radio. In that speech, Truman laid out the need to end discrimination, which would be advanced by the first comprehensive, presidentially proposed civil rights legislation. Truman on "civil rights and human freedom", declared:

In February 1948, Truman delivered a formal message to Congress requesting adoption of his 10-point program to secure civil rights, including anti-lynching, voter rights, and elimination of segregation. "No political act since the Compromise of 1877," argued biographer Taylor Branch, "so profoundly influenced race relations; in a sense it was a repeal of 1877."

1948 election 

The 1948 presidential election is remembered for Truman's stunning come-from-behind victory. In the spring of 1948, Truman's public approval rating stood at 36 percent, and the president was nearly universally regarded as incapable of winning the general election. At the 1948 Democratic National Convention, Truman attempted to unify the party with a vague civil rights plank in the party platform. His intention was to assuage the internal conflicts between the northern and southern wings of his party. Events overtook his efforts. A sharp address given by Mayor Hubert Humphrey of Minneapolis—as well as the local political interests of a number of urban bosses—convinced the convention to adopt a stronger civil rights plank, which Truman approved wholeheartedly. Truman delivered an aggressive acceptance speech attacking the 80th Congress, which Truman called the "Do Nothing Congress," and promising to win the election and "make these Republicans like it."

Within two weeks of the 1948 convention Truman issued Executive Order 9981, ending racial discrimination in the Armed Services, and Executive Order 9980 to end discrimination in federal agencies. Truman took a considerable political risk in backing civil rights, and many seasoned Democrats were concerned the loss of Dixiecrat support might seriously weaken the party. South Carolina Governor Strom Thurmond, a segregationist, declared his candidacy for the presidency on a Dixiecrat ticket and led a full-scale revolt of Southern "states' rights" proponents. This rebellion on the right was matched by one on the left, led by Wallace on the Progressive Party ticket. The Democratic Party was splitting three ways and victory in November seemed unlikely. For his running mate, Truman accepted Kentucky Senator Alben W. Barkley, though he really wanted Justice William O. Douglas, who turned down the nomination.

Truman's political advisors described the political scene as "one unholy, confusing cacophony." They told Truman to speak directly to the people, in a personal way. Campaign manager William J. Bray said Truman took this advice, and spoke personally and passionately, sometimes even setting aside his notes to talk to Americans "of everything that is in my heart and soul."

The campaign was a  presidential odyssey. In a personal appeal to the nation, Truman crisscrossed the United States by train; his "whistle stop" speeches from the rear platform of the observation car, Ferdinand Magellan, came to represent his campaign. His combative appearances captured the popular imagination and drew huge crowds. Six stops in Michigan drew a combined half-million people; a full million turned out for a New York City ticker-tape parade.

The large, mostly spontaneous gatherings at Truman's whistle-stop events were an important sign of a change in momentum in the campaign, but this shift went virtually unnoticed by the national press corps. It continued reporting Republican Thomas Dewey's apparent impending victory as a certainty. The three major polling organizations stopped polling well before the November 2 election date—Roper in September, and Crossley and Gallup in October—thus failing to measure the period when Truman appears to have surged past Dewey.

In the end, Truman held his progressive Midwestern base, won most of the Southern states despite the civil rights plank, and squeaked through with narrow victories in a few critical states, notably Ohio, California, and Illinois. The final tally showed the president had secured 303 electoral votes, Dewey 189, and Thurmond only 39. Henry Wallace got none. The defining image of the campaign came after Election Day, when an ecstatic Truman held aloft the erroneous front page of the Chicago Tribune with a huge headline proclaiming "Dewey Defeats Truman."

Full elected term (1949–1953) 
Truman's second inauguration was the first ever televised nationally.

Hydrogen bomb decision 
The Soviet Union's atomic bomb project progressed much faster than had been expected, and they detonated their first bomb on August 29, 1949. Over the next several months there was an intense debate that split the U.S. government, military, and scientific communities regarding whether to proceed with the development of the far more powerful hydrogen bomb. The debate touched on matters from technical feasibility to strategic value to the morality of creating a massively destructive weapon. On January 31, 1950, Truman made the decision to go forward on the grounds that if the Soviets could make an H-bomb, the United States must do so as well and stay ahead in the nuclear arms race. The development achieved fruition with the first U.S. H-bomb test on October 31, 1952, which was officially announced by Truman on January 7, 1953.

Korean War 

On June 25, 1950, the North Korean army under Kim Il-sung invaded South Korea, starting the Korean War. In the early weeks of the war, the North Koreans easily pushed back their southern counterparts. Truman called for a naval blockade of Korea, only to learn that due to budget cutbacks, the U.S. Navy could not enforce such a measure.

Truman promptly urged the United Nations to intervene; it did, authorizing troops under the UN flag led by U.S. General Douglas MacArthur. Truman decided he did not need formal authorization from Congress, believing that most legislators supported his position; this would come back to haunt him later when the stalemated conflict was dubbed "Mr. Truman's War" by legislators.

However, on July 3, 1950, Truman did give Senate Majority Leader Scott W. Lucas a draft resolution titled "Joint Resolution Expressing Approval of the Action Taken in Korea". Lucas stated Congress supported the use of force, the formal resolution would pass but was unnecessary, and the consensus in Congress was to acquiesce. Truman responded he did not want "to appear to be trying to get around Congress and use extra-Constitutional powers," and added that it was "up to Congress whether such a resolution should be introduced."

By August 1950, U.S. troops pouring into South Korea under UN auspices were able to stabilize the situation. Responding to criticism over readiness, Truman fired his secretary of defense, Louis A. Johnson, replacing him with the retired General Marshall. With UN approval, Truman decided on a "rollback" policy—liberation of North Korea. UN forces led by General Douglas MacArthur led the counterattack, scoring a stunning surprise victory with an amphibious landing at the Battle of Inchon that nearly trapped the invaders. UN forces marched north, toward the Yalu River boundary with China, with the goal of reuniting Korea under UN auspices.

China surprised the UN forces with a large-scale invasion in November. The UN forces were forced back to below the 38th parallel, then recovered. By early 1951 the war became a fierce stalemate at about the 38th parallel where it had begun. Truman rejected MacArthur's request to attack Chinese supply bases north of the Yalu, but MacArthur promoted his plan to Republican House leader Joseph Martin, who leaked it to the press. Truman was gravely concerned further escalation of the war might lead to open conflict with the Soviet Union, which was already supplying weapons and providing warplanes (with Korean markings and Soviet aircrew). Therefore, on April 11, 1951, Truman fired MacArthur from his commands.

The dismissal of General Douglas MacArthur was among the least politically popular decisions in presidential history. Truman's approval ratings plummeted, and he faced calls for his impeachment from, among others, Senator Robert A. Taft. Fierce criticism from virtually all quarters accused Truman of refusing to shoulder the blame for a war gone sour and blaming his generals instead. Others, including Eleanor Roosevelt and all of the Joint Chiefs of Staff, publicly supported Truman's decision. MacArthur meanwhile returned to the United States to a hero's welcome, and addressed a joint session of Congress, a speech the president called "a bunch of damn bullshit."

Truman and his generals considered the use of nuclear weapons against the Chinese army, but ultimately chose not to escalate the war to a nuclear level. The war remained a frustrating stalemate for two years, with over 30,000 Americans killed, until an armistice ended the fighting in 1953. In February 1952, Truman's approval mark stood at 22 percent according to Gallup polls, which is the all-time lowest approval mark for a sitting U.S. president, though it was matched by Richard Nixon in 1974.

Worldwide defense 

The escalation of the Cold War was highlighted by Truman's approval of NSC 68, a secret statement of foreign policy. It called for tripling the defense budget, and the globalization and militarization of containment policy whereby the United States and its NATO allies would respond militarily to actual Soviet expansion. The document was drafted by Paul Nitze, who consulted State and Defense officials and was formally approved by President Truman as the official national strategy after the war began in Korea. It called for partial mobilization of the U.S. economy to build armaments faster than the Soviets. The plan called for strengthening Europe, weakening the Soviet Union, and building up the United States both militarily and economically.

Truman was a strong supporter of the North Atlantic Treaty Organization (NATO), which established a formal peacetime military alliance with Canada and democratic European nations of the Western Bloc following World War II. The treaty establishing it was widely popular and easily passed the Senate in 1949; Truman appointed General Eisenhower as commander. NATO's goals were to contain Soviet expansion in Europe and to send a clear message to communist leaders that the world's democracies were willing and able to build new security structures in support of democratic ideals. The United States, Britain, France, Italy, the Netherlands, Belgium, Luxembourg, Norway, Denmark, Portugal, Iceland, and Canada were the original treaty signatories. The alliance resulted in the Soviets establishing a similar alliance, called the Warsaw Pact.

General Marshall was Truman's principal adviser on foreign policy matters, influencing such decisions as the U.S. choice against offering direct military aid to Chiang Kai-shek and his nationalist Chinese forces in the Chinese Civil War against their communist opponents. Marshall's opinion was contrary to the counsel of almost all of Truman's other advisers; Marshall thought propping up Chiang's forces would drain U.S. resources necessary for Europe to deter the Soviets. When the communists took control of the mainland, establishing the People's Republic of China and driving the nationalists to Taiwan, Truman would have been willing to maintain some relationship between the United States and the new government but Mao was unwilling. Truman announced on January 5, 1950, that the United States would not engage in any dispute involving the Taiwan Strait, and that he would not intervene in the event of an attack by the PRC.

On June 27, 1950, after the outbreak of fighting in Korea, Truman ordered the U.S. Navy's Seventh Fleet into the Taiwan Strait to prevent further conflict between the communist government on the China mainland and the Republic of China (ROC) on Taiwan.

Truman usually worked well with his top staff – the exceptions were Israel in 1948 and Spain in 1945–1950. Truman was a very strong opponent of Francisco Franco, the right-wing dictator of Spain. He withdrew the American ambassador (but diplomatic relations were not formally broken), kept Spain out of the UN, and rejected any Marshall Plan financial aid to Spain. However, as the Cold War escalated, support for Spain was strong in Congress, the Pentagon, the business community and other influential elements especially Catholics and cotton growers.

Liberal opposition to Spain had faded after the Wallace element broke with the Democratic Party in 1948; the CIO became passive on the issue. As Secretary of State Acheson increased his pressure on Truman, the president stood alone in his administration as his own top appointees wanted to normalize relations. When China entered the Korean War and pushed American forces back, the argument for allies became irresistible. Admitting he was "overruled and worn down," Truman relented and sent an ambassador and made loans available.

Soviet espionage and McCarthyism 

In August 1948, Whittaker Chambers, a former spy for the Soviets and a senior editor at Time magazine, testified before the House Un-American Activities Committee (HUAC). He said an underground communist network had worked inside the U.S. government during the 1930s, of which Chambers had been a member, along with Alger Hiss, until recently a senior State Department official. Chambers did not allege any spying during the Truman presidency. Although Hiss denied the allegations, he was convicted in January 1950 for perjury for denials under oath.

The Soviet Union's success in exploding an atomic weapon in 1949 and the fall of the nationalist Chinese the same year led many Americans to conclude subversion by Soviet spies was responsible and to demand that communists be rooted out from the government and other places of influence. Hoping to contain these fears, Truman began a "loyalty program" with Executive Order 9835 in 1947. However, Truman got himself into deeper trouble when he called the Hiss trial a "red herring". Wisconsin Senator Joseph McCarthy accused the State Department of harboring communists and rode the controversy to political fame, leading to the Second Red Scare, also known as McCarthyism. McCarthy's stifling accusations made it difficult to speak out against him. This led President Harry Truman to call McCarthy "the greatest asset the Kremlin has" by "torpedo[ing] the bipartisan foreign policy of the United States."

Charges that Soviet agents had infiltrated the government were believed by 78 percent of the people in 1946 and became a major campaign issue for Eisenhower in 1952. Truman was reluctant to take a more radical stance, because he felt it could threaten civil liberties and add to a potential hysteria. At the same time, he felt political pressure to indicate a strong national security. It is unclear to what extent President Truman was briefed of the Venona intercepts, which discovered widespread evidence of Soviet espionage on the atom bomb project and afterward. Truman continued his own loyalty program for some time while believing the issue of communist espionage was overstated. In 1949, Truman described American communist leaders, whom his administration was prosecuting, as "traitors", but in 1950 he vetoed the McCarran Internal Security Act. It was passed over his veto. Truman would later state in private conversations with friends that his creation of a loyalty program had been a "terrible" mistake.

Blair House and assassination attempt 

In 1948, Truman ordered an addition to the exterior of the White House: a second-floor balcony in the south portico, which came to be known as the Truman Balcony. The addition was unpopular. Some said it spoiled the appearance of the south facade, but it gave the First Family more living space.  Meanwhile, structural deterioration and a near-imminent collapse of the White House led to a comprehensive dismantling and rebuilding of the building's interior from 1949 to 1952. Architectural and engineering investigations during 1948 deemed it unsafe for occupancy. President Harry S. Truman, his family, and the entire residence staff were relocated across the street into Blair House during the renovations. As the newer West Wing, including the Oval Office, remained open, Truman walked to and from his work across the street each morning and afternoon.

On November 1, 1950, Puerto Rican nationalists Griselio Torresola and Oscar Collazo attempted to assassinate Truman at Blair House. On the street outside the residence, Torresola mortally wounded a White House policeman, Leslie Coffelt. Before he died, the officer shot and killed Torresola. Collazo was wounded and stopped before he entered the house. He was found guilty of murder and sentenced to death in 1952. Truman commuted his sentence to life in prison. To try to settle the question of Puerto Rican independence, Truman allowed a plebiscite in Puerto Rico in 1952 to determine the status of its relationship to the United States. Nearly 82 percent of the people voted in favor of a new constitution for the Estado Libre Asociado, a continued 'associated free state.'

Steel and coal strikes 

In response to a labor/management impasse arising from bitter disagreements over wage and price controls, Truman instructed his Secretary of Commerce, Charles W. Sawyer, to take control of a number of the nation's steel mills in April 1952. Truman cited his authority as commander in chief and the need to maintain an uninterrupted supply of steel for munitions for the war in Korea. The Supreme Court found Truman's actions unconstitutional, however, and reversed the order in a major separation-of-powers decision, Youngstown Sheet & Tube Co. v. Sawyer (1952). The 6–3 decision, which held that Truman's assertion of authority was too vague and was not rooted in any legislative action by Congress, was delivered by a court composed entirely of justices appointed by either Truman or Roosevelt. The high court's reversal of Truman's order was one of the notable defeats of his presidency.

Scandals and controversies 

In 1950, the Senate, led by Estes Kefauver, investigated numerous charges of corruption among senior administration officials, some of whom received fur coats and deep freezers in exchange for favors. A large number of employees of the Internal Revenue Bureau (today the IRS) were accepting bribes; 166 employees either resigned or were fired in 1950, with many soon facing indictment. When Attorney General J. Howard McGrath fired the special prosecutor in early 1952 for being too zealous, Truman fired McGrath. Truman submitted a reorganization plan to reform the IRB; Congress passed it, but corruption was a major issue in the 1952 presidential election.

On December 6, 1950, Washington Post music critic Paul Hume wrote a critical review of a concert by the president's daughter Margaret Truman:

Truman wrote a scathing response:

Truman was criticized by many for the letter. However, he pointed out that he wrote it as a loving father and not as the president.

In 1951, William M. Boyle, Truman's longtime friend and chairman of the Democratic National Committee, was forced to resign after being charged with financial corruption.

Civil rights 

A 1947 report by the Truman administration titled To Secure These Rights presented a detailed ten-point agenda of civil rights reforms. Speaking about this report, international developments have to be taken into account, for with the UN Charter being passed in 1945, the question of whether international human rights law could be applicable also on an inner-land basis became crucial in the United States. Though the report acknowledged such a path was not free from controversy in the 1940s United States, it nevertheless raised the possibility for the UN-Charter to be used as a legal tool to combat racial discrimination in the United States.

In February 1948, the president submitted a civil rights agenda to Congress that proposed creating several federal offices devoted to issues such as voting rights and fair employment practices. This provoked a storm of criticism from southern Democrats in the runup to the national nominating convention, but Truman refused to compromise, saying: "My forebears were Confederates ... but my very stomach turned over when I had learned that Negro soldiers, just back from overseas, were being dumped out of Army trucks in Mississippi and beaten."

Tales of the abuse, violence, and persecution suffered by many African-American veterans upon their return from World War II infuriated Truman and were major factors in his decision to issue Executive Order 9981, in July 1948, requiring equal opportunity in the armed forces. In the early 1950s after several years of planning, recommendations and revisions between Truman, the Committee on Equality of Treatment and Opportunity and the various branches of the military, the services became racially integrated.

Executive Order 9980, also in 1948, made it illegal to discriminate against persons applying for civil service positions based on race. A third, in 1951, established the Committee on Government Contract Compliance, which ensured defense contractors did not discriminate because of race. In 1950 he vetoed the McCarran Internal Security Act. It was passed over his veto.

Administration and cabinet

Foreign policy

From 1947 until 1989, world affairs were dominated by the Cold War, in which the U.S. and its allies faced the Soviet Union and its allies. There was no large-scale fighting but instead several local civil wars as well as the ever-present threat of a catastrophic nuclear war.

Unlike Roosevelt, Truman distrusted Stalin and the Soviet Union, and did not have FDR's faith in the UN to soften major tensions. Nevertheless, he cooperated in terms of dividing control over Germany. Soviet efforts to use its army to control politics in Eastern Europe and Iran angered Washington. The final break came in 1947 when the Labour government in London could no longer afford to help Greece fight communism and asked Washington to assume responsibility for suppressing the Communist uprising there. The result was the Truman Doctrine of 1947–48 which made it national policy to contain Communist expansion.

Truman was supported by the great majority of Democrats, after he forced out the Henry Wallace faction that wanted good terms with Moscow. Truman's policy had the strong support of most Republicans, who led by Senator Arthur Vandenberg overcame the isolationist Republicans led by Senator Robert A. Taft.

In 1948, Truman signed the Marshall Plan, which supplied Western Europe—including Germany—with US$13 billion in reconstruction aid. Stalin vetoed any participation by East European nations. A similar program was operated by the United States to restore the Japanese economy. The U.S. actively sought allies, which it subsidized with military and economic "foreign aid", as well as diplomatic support. The main diplomatic initiative was the establishment of the North Atlantic Treaty Organization (NATO) in 1949, committing the United States to nuclear defense of Western Europe. The result was a peace in Europe, coupled with the fear of Soviet invasion and a reliance on American protection. The United States operated a worldwide network of bases for its Army, Navy and Air Force, with large contingents stationed in Germany, Japan and South Korea. Washington had a weak intelligence community before 1942, and the Soviets had a very effective network of spies. The solution was to create the Central Intelligence Agency (CIA) in 1947. Economic and propaganda warfare against the communist world became part of the American toolbox.

The containment policy was developed by State Department official George Kennan in 1947. Kennan characterized the Soviet Union as an aggressive, anti-Western power that necessitated containment, a characterization which would shape US foreign policy for decades to come. The idea of containment was to match Soviet aggression with force wherever it occurred while not using nuclear weapons. The policy of containment created a bipolar, zero-sum world where the ideological conflicts between the Soviet Union and the United States dominated geopolitics. Due to the antagonism on both sides and each countries' search for security, a tense worldwide contest developed between the two states as the two nations' governments vied for global supremacy militarily, culturally, and politically.

The Cold War was characterized by a lack of global hot wars Instead there were proxy wars, fought by client states and proxies of the United States and Soviet Union. The most important was Korean War (1950–1953), a stalemate that drained away Truman's base of support. Truman made five international trips during his presidency.

1952 election 

In 1951, the United States ratified the 22nd Amendment, making a president ineligible for election to a third term or for election to a second full term after serving more than two remaining years of a term of a previously elected president. The latter clause did not apply to Truman's situation in 1952 because of a grandfather clause exempting the incumbent president.

Therefore, he seriously considered running for another term in 1952 and left his name on the ballot in the New Hampshire primary. However all his close advisors, pointing to his age, his failing abilities, and his poor showing in the polls, talked him out of it. At the time of the 1952 New Hampshire primary, no candidate had won Truman's backing. His first choice, Chief Justice Fred M. Vinson, had declined to run; Illinois Governor Adlai Stevenson had also turned Truman down, Vice President Barkley was considered too old, and Truman distrusted and disliked Senator Kefauver, who had made a name for himself by his investigations of the Truman administration scandals.

Truman let his name be entered in the New Hampshire primary by supporters. The highly unpopular Truman was handily defeated by Kefauver; 18 days later the president formally announced he would not seek a second full term. Truman was eventually able to persuade Stevenson to run, and the governor gained the nomination at the 1952 Democratic National Convention.

Eisenhower gained the Republican nomination, with Senator Nixon as his running mate, and campaigned against what he denounced as Truman's failures: "Korea, communism and corruption". He pledged to clean up the "mess in Washington," and promised to "go to Korea." Eisenhower defeated Stevenson decisively in the general election, ending 20 years of Democratic presidents. While Truman and Eisenhower had previously been on good terms, Truman felt annoyed that Eisenhower did not denounce Joseph McCarthy during the campaign. Similarly, Eisenhower was outraged when Truman accused the former general of disregarding "sinister forces ... Anti-Semitism, anti-Catholicism, and anti-foreignism" within the Republican Party.

Post-presidency (1953–1972)

Financial situation

Before being elected as Jackson County judge, Truman had earned little money, and was in debt from the failure of his haberdashery. His election as senator in 1934 carried with it a salary of $10,000 (about $210,000 in 2022), high for the time, but the need to maintain two homes, with one in expensive Washington, Margaret Truman's college expenses, and contributions to the support of needy relatives, left the Trumans little extra money. He probably had about $7,500 in cash and government bonds when nominated for vice president.

His finances were transformed by his accession to the presidency, which carried with it a salary of $75,000 ($1.24 million in 2022), which was increased to $100,000 in 1949 (about $1.25 million in 2022). This was more than any Major League Baseball star except Joe DiMaggio, who also earned $100,000 in his final two seasons (1950 and 1951). Beginning in 1949, the president was also granted a $50,000 expense allowance ($589,000 in 2022), which was initially tax-free, and did not have to be accounted for. Although the allowance became taxable later in his presidency, Truman never reported it on his tax return, and converted some of the funds to cash he kept in the White House safe and later in a safe deposit box in Kansas City.

Upon leaving the presidency, Truman returned to Independence, Missouri, to live at the Wallace home he and Bess had shared for years with her mother. In a biography that contributed greatly to the myth that Truman was near penury after departing the White House, David McCullough stated that the Trumans had little alternative than to return to Independence, for his only income was his army pension of $112.56 per month, and he had only been able to save a modest amount from his salary as president. In February 1953, Truman signed a book deal for his memoirs, and in a draft will dated December of that year listed land worth $250,000, savings bonds of the same amount, and cash of $150,000. He wrote, "Bonds, land, and cash all come from savings of presidential salary and free expense account. It should keep you and Margaret comfortably."

The writing of the memoirs was a struggle for Truman and he went through a dozen collaborators during the project, not all of whom served him well, but he remained heavily involved in the result. For the memoirs, Truman received a payment of $670,000. The memoirs were a commercial and critical success. They were published in two volumes: Memoirs by Harry S. Truman: Year of Decisions (1955) and Memoirs by Harry S. Truman: Years of Trial and Hope (1956).

Former members of Congress and the federal courts received a federal retirement package; President Truman himself ensured that former servants of the executive branch of government received similar support. In 1953, however, there was no such benefit package for former presidents, and Congressional pensions were not approved until 1946, after Truman had left the Senate, so he received no pension for his Senate service. Truman, behind the scenes, lobbied for a pension, writing to congressional leaders that he had been near penury but for the sale of family farmlands, and in February 1958, in the first televised interview of a former US president that aired on CBS, Truman claimed that "If I hadn't inherited some property that finally paid things through, I'd be on relief right now." That year, Congress passed the Former Presidents Act, offering a $25,000 yearly pension to each former president, and it is likely that Truman's claim to be in difficult financial straits played a role in the law's enactment. The only other living former president at the time, Herbert Hoover, also took the pension, even though he did not need the money; reportedly, he did so to avoid embarrassing Truman.

Truman's net worth improved further in 1958 when he and his siblings sold most of the family farm to a Kansas City real estate developer. When he was serving as a county judge, Truman borrowed $31,000 by mortgaging the farm to the county school fund, which was legal at the time. When Republicans controlled the court in 1940, they foreclosed in an effort to embarrass Truman politically, and his mother and sister Mary Jane had to vacate the home. In 1945, Truman organized a syndicate of supporters who purchased the farm with the understanding that they would sell it back to the Trumans. Harry and Vivian Truman purchased 87 acres in 1945, and Truman purchased another portion in 1946. In January 1959, Truman calculated his net worth as $1,046,788.86 ($10.71 million in 2022), including a share in the Los Angeles Rams football team. Nevertheless, the Trumans always lived modestly in Independence, and when Bess Truman died in 1982, almost a decade after her husband, the house was found to be in poor condition due to deferred maintenance.

Bess Truman's personal papers were made public in 2009, including financial records and tax returns. The myth that Truman had been in straitened circumstances after his presidency was slow to dissipate; Paul Campos wrote in 2021, "The current, 20,000-plus-word Wikipedia biography of Truman goes so far as to assert that, because his earlier business ventures had failed, Truman left the White House with 'no personal savings.' Every aspect of this narrative is false."

Truman Library and academic positions

Truman's predecessor, Franklin D. Roosevelt, had organized his own presidential library, but legislation to enable future presidents to do something similar had not been enacted. Truman worked to garner private donations to build a presidential library, which he donated to the federal government to maintain and operate—a practice adopted by his successors.

He testified before Congress to have money appropriated to have presidential papers copied and organized, and was proud of the bill's passage in 1957. Max Skidmore, in his book on the life of former presidents, wrote that Truman was a well-read man, especially in history. Skidmore added that the presidential papers legislation and the founding of his library "was the culmination of his interest in history. Together they constitute an enormous contribution to the United States—one of the greatest of any former president."

Truman taught occasional courses at universities, including Yale, where he was a Chubb Fellow visiting lecturer in 1958. In 1962, Truman was a visiting lecturer at Canisius College.

Politics
Truman supported Adlai Stevenson's second bid for the White House in 1956, although he had initially favored Democratic governor W. Averell Harriman of New York. He continued to campaign for Democratic senatorial candidates for many years.

In 1960 Truman gave a public statement announcing he would not attend the Democratic Convention that year, citing concerns about the way that the supporters of John F. Kennedy had gained control of the nominating process, and called on Kennedy to forgo the nomination for that year. Kennedy responded with a press conference where he bluntly rebuffed Truman's advice.

Despite his supportive stance on civil rights during his presidency, Truman expressed criticism of the civil rights movement during the 1960s. In 1960, he stated that he believed the sit-in movement to be part of a Soviet plot. Truman's statement garnered a response from Martin Luther King Jr., who wrote a letter to Truman stating that he was "baffled" by Truman's accusation, and demanded a public apology. Truman would later criticize King following the Selma march in 1965, believing the protest to be "silly" and claiming that it "[couldn't] accomplish a darn thing except to attract attention." In 1963, Truman voiced his opposition to interracial marriage, believing that daughters of white people would never love someone of an opposite color.

Upon turning 80 in 1964, Truman was feted in Washington, and addressed the Senate, availing himself of a new rule that allowed former presidents to be granted privilege of the floor.

Medicare
After a fall in his home in late 1964, Truman's physical condition declined. In 1965, President Lyndon B. Johnson signed the Medicare bill at the Harry S. Truman Presidential Library and Museum and gave the first two Medicare cards to Truman and his wife Bess to honor the former president's fight for government health care while in office.

Death 

On December 5, 1972, Truman was admitted to Kansas City's Research Hospital and Medical Center with pneumonia. He developed multiple organ failure, fell into a coma, and died at 7:50 a.m. on December 26, at the age of 88.

Bess Truman opted for a simple private service at the library rather than a state funeral in Washington. A week after the funeral, foreign dignitaries and Washington officials attended a memorial service at Washington National Cathedral.

Bess Truman died in 1982 and was buried next to her husband at the Harry S. Truman Library and Museum in Independence, Missouri.

Tributes and legacy

Legacy 

When he left office in 1953, Truman was one of the most unpopular chief executives in history. His job approval rating of 22% in the Gallup Poll of February 1952 was lower than Richard Nixon's 24% in August 1974, the month that Nixon resigned. American public feeling towards Truman grew steadily warmer with the passing years; as early as 1962, a poll of 75 historians conducted by Arthur M. Schlesinger, Sr. ranked Truman among the "near great" presidents. The period following his death consolidated a partial rehabilitation of his legacy among both historians and members of the public. Truman died when the nation was consumed with crises in Vietnam and Watergate, and his death brought a new wave of attention to his political career. In the early and mid-1970s, Truman captured the popular imagination much as he had in 1948, this time emerging as a kind of political folk hero, a president who was thought to exemplify an integrity and accountability many observers felt was lacking in the Nixon White House. This public reassessment of Truman was aided by the popularity of a book of reminiscences which Truman had told to journalist Merle Miller beginning in 1961, with the agreement that they would not be published until after Truman's death.

Truman had his latter-day critics as well. After a review of information available to Truman about the presence of espionage activities in the U.S. government, Democratic Senator Daniel Patrick Moynihan concluded that Truman was "almost willfully obtuse" concerning the danger of American communism. In 2010, historian Alonzo Hamby concluded that "Harry Truman remains a controversial president." However, since leaving office, Truman has fared well in polls ranking the presidents. He has never been listed lower than ninth, and most recently was fifth in a C-SPAN poll in 2009.

The fall of the Soviet Union in 1991 caused Truman advocates to claim vindication for Truman's decisions in the postwar period. According to Truman biographer Robert Dallek, "His contribution to victory in the cold war without a devastating nuclear conflict elevated him to the stature of a great or near-great president." The 1992 publication of David McCollough's favorable biography of Truman further cemented the view of Truman as a highly regarded chief executive. According to historian Daniel R. McCoy in his book on the Truman presidency,

Sites and honors 

In 1956, Truman traveled to Europe with his wife. In Britain, he received an honorary degree in Civic Law from Oxford University and met with Winston Churchill. In 1959, he was given a 50-year award by the Masons, recognizing his longstanding involvement: he was initiated on February 9, 1909, into the Belton Freemasonry Lodge in Missouri. In 1911, he helped establish the Grandview Lodge, and he served as its first Worshipful Master. In September 1940, during his Senate re-election campaign, Truman was elected Grand Master of the Missouri Grand Lodge of Freemasonry; Truman said later that the Masonic election assured his victory in the general election. In 1945, he was made a 33° Sovereign Grand Inspector General and an Honorary Member of the supreme council at the Supreme Council A.A.S.R. Southern Jurisdiction Headquarters in Washington D.C.  Truman was also a member of Sons of the American Revolution (SAR) and a card-carrying member of the Sons of Confederate Veterans. Two of his relatives were Confederate soldiers.

In 1975, the Truman Scholarship was created as a federal program to honor U.S. college students who exemplified dedication to public service and leadership in public policy. 

In 1983 the Harry S. Truman State Office Building in Jefferson City was completed.

In 2004, the President Harry S. Truman Fellowship in National Security Science and Engineering was created as a distinguished postdoctoral three-year appointment at Sandia National Laboratories. In 2001, the University of Missouri established the Harry S. Truman School of Public Affairs to advance the study and practice of governance. The University of Missouri's Missouri Tigers athletic programs have an official mascot named Truman the Tiger. On July 1, 1996, Northeast Missouri State University became Truman State University—to mark its transformation from a teachers' college to a highly selective liberal arts university and to honor the only Missourian to become president. A member institution of the City Colleges of Chicago, Harry S Truman College in Chicago, Illinois, is named in his honor for his dedication to public colleges and universities. In 2000, the headquarters for the State Department, built in the 1930s but never officially named, was dedicated as the Harry S Truman Building.

Despite Truman's attempt to curtail the naval carrier arm, which led to the 1949 Revolt of the Admirals, an aircraft carrier is named after him. The  was christened on September 7, 1996.  The 129th Field Artillery Regiment is designated "Truman's Own" in recognition of Truman's service as commander of its D Battery during World War I.

In 1991, Truman was inducted into the Hall of Famous Missourians, and a bronze bust depicting him is on permanent display in the rotunda of the Missouri State Capitol. In 2006, Thomas Daniel, grandson of the Trumans, accepted a star on the Missouri Walk of Fame to honor his late grandfather. In 2007, John Truman, a nephew, accepted a star for Bess Truman. The Walk of Fame is in Marshfield, Missouri, a city Truman visited in 1948.

A statue of Harry S. Truman was installed in the U.S. Capitol, in Washington, D.C., on September 29, 2022, as part of the National Statuary Hall Collection.

Other sites associated with Truman include:

 Harry S. Truman National Historic Site includes the Wallace House at 219 N. Delaware in Independence and the family farmhouse at Grandview, Missouri (Truman sold most of the farm for Kansas City suburban development including the Truman Corners Shopping Center).
 Harry S. Truman Birthplace State Historic Site is the house where Truman was born and spent 11 months in Lamar, Missouri.
 Harry S. Truman Presidential Library and Museum – The Presidential library in Independence
 Harry S. Truman Little White House – Truman's winter getaway at Key West, Florida

See also 
 Electoral history of Harry S. Truman
 Truman (film)
 Truman Day
 List of members of the American Legion
 List of presidents of the United States
 "Harry Truman", a 1975 hit song by the band Chicago

Notes

References

Bibliography

Biographies of Truman 
 
 
 
 
 
 
 
 
 
 
 
 
 
 Margolies, Daniel S. ed. A Companion to Harry S. Truman (2012); 614pp; emphasis on historiography; see Sean J. Savage, "Truman in Historical, Popular, and Political Memory," pp. 9–25. excerpt

Books 
 
 
 
 
 
 
 
 
 
 Haas, Lawrence J. Harry & Arthur: Truman, Vandenberg, and the Partnership That Created the Free World (2016)

Primary sources 
  online
  online v 2

Journals 
 
 
 
 Heaster, Brenda L. "Who's on Second: The 1944 Democratic Vice Presidential Nomination." Missouri Historical Review 80.2 (1986): 156-175.
 
 
  reprinted in

Time

The Washington Post

The New York Times

Harry S. Truman Library and Museum 
 McCray, Suzanne, and Tara Yglesias, eds. Wild about Harry: Everything You Have Ever Wanted to Know about the Truman Scholarship (University of Arkansas Press, 2021), how to work at this Library. online

 
 
 
 
 
 
 
 
 
 
 
 
 
 
 
 
 
 
 
 
 
 
 
  Originally published in the Independence Examiner, Truman Centennial Edition.

Online sources 
 , published by Arbeitskreis Menschenrechte im 20. Jahrhundert
 
 
 
 
 
 
 
 
 
 
 
 
 
 
 
 
 
 
 
 
 
 
 
 
  searches run from page, "select research categories" then check "court type" and "nominating president", then select U.S. District Courts (or U.S. Circuit Courts) and also Harry Truman.

External links 

Official
 Harry S. Truman Library & Museum
 Harry S Truman National Historic Site
 White House biography

Media coverage
 
 

Other
 
 Harry S. Truman: A Resource Guide from the Library of Congress
 Federal Bureau of Investigation Records: The Vault – Harry S. Truman
 Essays on Harry S. Truman, each member of his cabinet and First Lady from the Miller Center of Public Affairs
 The Presidents: Truman , an American Experience documentary
 
 
 "Life Portrait of Harry S. Truman", from C-SPAN's American presidents: Life Portraits, October 18, 1999
 
 Harry S. Truman Personal Manuscripts
 
 
 1948 election episode in CNN's Race for the White House

1884 births
1972 deaths
20th-century American businesspeople
20th-century American judges
20th-century presidents of the United States
20th-century vice presidents of the United States
American anti-communists
American anti-fascists
20th-century American memoirists
United States Army personnel of World War I
American people of the Korean War
Atchison, Topeka and Santa Fe Railway people
Burials in Missouri
Congressional Gold Medal recipients
County executives of Jackson County, Missouri
Deaths from multiple organ failure
Democratic Party presidents of the United States
Democratic Party (United States) presidential nominees
Democratic Party United States senators from Missouri
Democratic Party (United States) vice presidential nominees
Democratic Party vice presidents of the United States
American Freemasons
Haberdashers
Deaths from pneumonia in Missouri
Masonic Grand Masters
Members of Sons of Confederate Veterans
Military personnel from Missouri
Missouri Democrats
National Guard (United States) officers
Pendergast era
People from Grandview, Missouri
People from Lamar, Missouri
Politicians from Independence, Missouri
Presidency of Harry S. Truman
Presidents of the United States
Solomon Bublick Award recipients
Sons of the American Revolution
Time Person of the Year
Truman family
United States Army colonels
Candidates in the 1948 United States presidential election
Candidates in the 1952 United States presidential election
1944 United States vice-presidential candidates
University of Missouri–Kansas City alumni
Vice presidents of the United States
William Chrisman High School alumni
World War II political leaders
People of the Cold War
United States Army reservists
United States Army Field Artillery Branch personnel
Members of the Benevolent and Protective Order of Elks
Liberalism in the United States